Tamara Viktorovna Davydenko (born 8 June 1975 in Pinsk) is a Belarus rower.

References 
 
 

1975 births
Living people
Belarusian female rowers
Sportspeople from Pinsk
Rowers at the 1996 Summer Olympics
Olympic bronze medalists for Belarus
Olympic rowers of Belarus
Olympic medalists in rowing
World Rowing Championships medalists for Belarus
Medalists at the 1996 Summer Olympics